Glickenhaus may refer to:

 James Glickenhaus (born 1950), American film producer, financier, director and automotive entrepreneur
 Shapiro-Glickenhaus Entertainment (SGE), a former home video company
 Scuderia Cameron Glickenhaus, also commonly known as Glickenhaus, a sports car company
 Scuderia Cameron Glickenhaus SCG 003, a sports and racing car.